Andrew Ronald Roscoe (born 4 June 1973) is an English left sided defender or midfielder whose last job was as assistant manager at Leigh RMI having joined in 2003 from Exeter City. Roscoe has also played for Bolton, Mansfield, and Rotherham. He started his career at Liverpool. He has played for Liverpool in the Mersey Masters.

Honours

Club
Rotherham United
Football League Trophy (1): 1995–96

Individual
Leigh RMI Manager's Player of the Year: 2005–06
Leigh RMI Players' Player of the Year: 2005–06

References

External links

1973 births
Living people
English footballers
Footballers from Liverpool
Association football defenders
Association football midfielders
Association football wingers
Bolton Wanderers F.C. players
English Football League players
Rotherham United F.C. players
Mansfield Town F.C. players
Exeter City F.C. players
Leigh Genesis F.C. players
National League (English football) players
Atherton Laburnum Rovers F.C. players